Ashok Rane is a two-time National Award-winning film critic, the director of the Indian Film Academy, a professor of film studies for 35 years, film mentor, coorditator-Maharashtra Film and Stage Cultural Development Corporation, and an author.

Jury member
Toronto International Film Festival
Rotterdam International Film Festival
Montreal World Film Festival
Busan International Film Festival
Moscow International Film Festival
IFFI-2011

Panel member (incomplete)
Film Critics Circle of India panel at IFFI on the impact of technology in cinema.

Books
Sakhkhe Sobati 
Adhyayanache Strot  
Montage 
Cinema Pahnara Manus

Awards 

 Special Mention (Book on Cinema Cinemachi Chittarkatha) - 1995
 Special Mention (Film Critic) - 2002

References

External links
National Film Awards Archives

Year of birth missing (living people)
Living people
Indian film critics